Krasnobród Landscape Park (Krasnobrodzki Park Krajobrazowy) is a protected area (Landscape Park) in eastern Poland, established in 1988 below the town of Krasnobród and covering an area of . It is one of four landscape parks in the Roztocze region.

Location
The Park lies within Lublin Voivodeship: in Biłgoraj County (Gmina Józefów), Tomaszów Lubelski County (Gmina Susiec, Gmina Tomaszów Lubelski) and Zamość County (Gmina Adamów, Gmina Krasnobród). It is a popular tourist destination for the region.

Within the Landscape Park are two nature reserves.

See also
List of landscape parks of Poland

Notes

Landscape parks in Poland
Parks in Lublin Voivodeship